Regina Maria may refer to:

Queen Marie of Romania (1875-1938)
Regina Maria (Romanian frigate)
Regina Maria, Soroca, a village and commune in Moldova
Regina Maria, former name of Semionovca, a village in Mingir Commune, Hînceşti district, Moldova
Regina Maria, former name of Avram Iancu Commune, Bihor County, Romania
Regina Maria, former name of Horia Commune, Tulcea County, Romania

See also 
Regia Marina, the Royal Italian Navy